When Every Day Was the Fourth of July is a 1978 American made-for-television drama film about a Jewish-American family in 1937 Bridgeport, Connecticut.  Narrated in first person flashback, the story follows a 12-year-old boy and his family who find themselves defending the town "misfit" after he's accused of murder.  The film was written, produced and directed by Dan Curtis, and stars Dean Jones, Geoffrey Lewis, Chris Petersen, and Katy Kurtzman.  It was followed by the 1980 ABC television film sequel The Long Days of Summer.

Plot
It's the summer of 1937 in Bridgeport, Connecticut and 12-year-old Daniel Cooper along with his 10-year-old sister Sarah are looking forward to summer vacation, most particularly, the annual 4th of July festivities.  Sarah soon befriends the town's gentle misfit, Albert Cavanaugh, known by the town's children as "Snowman", a highly decorated and now brain-damaged World War I veteran, after she defends him from the town's resident bully, "Red" Doyle.  When Snowman finds himself accused of a terrible murder, Sarah, believing him to be innocent, convinces her successful attorney father, Ed Cooper to defend him.  Amid courtroom allegations of communism and insinuations of a potentially inappropriate relationship with Sarah, Ed Cooper and the town's children must try to prove Snowman's innocence, before he can be convicted of the murder.

Cast

Production
Although fictionalized, Dan Curtis wrote the story based on his own childhood growing up in Bridgeport, Connecticut, with the character of Danny representing himself as a child.  Many of the characters are based on real people Curtis knew growing up, including Danny and Sarah's friends in the film, who are each named after Curtis' own childhood friends, however, Curtis did not have a sister, and instead, the role of Sarah was based on co-writer/producer Lee Hutson's sister of the same name.

Curtis had originally wanted to shoot the film in his childhood hometown of Bridgeport, but for financial and logistical reasons, the decision was made to film in California, using Echo Park, Los Angeles for the outdoor "neighborhood" scenes.

Just one day before principal photography was set to begin, Curtis had still yet to find a boy who was right for the part of Harold "Red" Doyle, when veteran child actor Eric Shea came in to read for the role and was hired on the spot.  Seventeen years old at the time of filming, this would be Shea's final role before leaving show business.

Matt Groening has stated that his first job in Los Angeles was as an extra in this film.

Awards

See also
The Long Days of Summer (1980 sequel)

References

External links

1978 television films
1978 films
1978 drama films
American drama films
Films set in the 1930s
Films set in 1937
Films set in Connecticut
Independence Day (United States) films
Films directed by Dan Curtis
Films scored by Walter Scharf
NBC network original films
Films shot in Los Angeles
1970s English-language films
1970s American films